WenQuanYi (aka: Spring of Letters) is an open-source project of Chinese computer fonts licensed under GNU General Public License.

General
WenQuanYi project was started by Qianqian Fang (Screen name: FangQ), a Chinese biomedical imaging researcher at the Massachusetts General Hospital, in October, 2004.

The fonts of the WenQuanYi project are now included with the Linux distributions Ubuntu, Fedora, Slackware, Magic Linux and CDLinux. Debian, Gentoo, Mandriva, Arch Linux and Frugalware offer the sources for WenQuanYi fonts. The fonts are among the Chinese fonts officially supported by Wikimedia.

WenQuanYi's website is using Habitat, a Wiki software derived from UseModWiki by Qianqian Fang. It is allowed to create or modify the glyphs online.

Fonts
WenQuanYi project aims to create high-quality open-source bitmap and outline fonts for all CJK characters. It includes Zen Hei (Regular, Mono and Sharp), Micro Hei (Regular and Mono), Bitmap Song and Unibit font. As of version 0.8.38, the WenQuanYi Zen Hei font covers more than 35,000 glyphs.

Zen Hei
WenQuanYi Zen Hei (文泉驿正黑),  WenQuanYi Zen Hei Mono (文泉驿等宽正黑) and WenQuanYi Zen Hei Sharp (文泉驿点阵正黑) co-exist in a single TTC file. They are also with embedded bitmaps. The Latin/Hangul characters are derived from UnDotum, Bopomofo are from cwTeX, mono-spaced Latin are from M+ M2 Light. These fonts have full CJK coverage. The font package is included with Fedora and Ubuntu.

Micro Hei
WenQuanYi Micro Hei (文泉驿微米黑), WenQuanYi Micro Hei Mono (文泉驿等宽微米黑) are derived from the Droid Sans font (merged with Droid Sans Fallback) and readable in compact sizes. The primitive motivation of this project was to extend Droid Sans Fallback's glyph coverage. Since the GB 18030 compatible Droid Sans Fallback font's release, the Micro Hei project has been de facto inactive. 

Unlike Zen Hei, which is drawn stroke-by-stroke, Micro Hei and its predecessor Droid Sans are created by combining radical components using TrueType references. The main goal is a reduced file size, hence "Micro".

Bitmap Song
WenQuanYi Bitmap Song (文泉驿点阵宋体) has full coverage to GB 18030 Hanzi at 11-16px (9pt-12pt) font sizes.

Unibit
WenQuanYi Unibit (文泉驿Unibit) adopted the GNU Unifont's scheme of 8x16 and 16x16 glyphs. Then the contributors added 10,000 more glyphs. The improvements done by WenQuanYi Unibit has been merged back to GNU Unifont.

Glyph
The glyph of traditional characters included in WenQuanYi is the new character form of the Mainland China. The glyph comes from G-Source (character source from Mainland China) of Unicode and the standard of a character list from the 1988 List of Commonly Used Characters in Modern Chinese and the 2009 List of General Standardized Chinese (通用规范汉字表).

The glyph is not from T-Source (character source from Taiwan) and H-Source (character source from Hong Kong). It does not conform with the standardized traditional character writing behavior of writers from Taiwan and Hong Kong. In other words, it does not support the traditional Chinese character set. (For more information, see Han unification.)

Some examples of characters with different glyph are: 別, 吳, 骨, 角, 過, 這, 草, 放, etc.

See also
 Unicode fonts
 List of CJK fonts

Notes

References

External links

 (Official site in English)

CJK typefaces
Free software Unicode typefaces
Typefaces and fonts introduced in 2004